Agrapart & Fils is a Grower Champagne producer which makes organic wines with a focus on terroir.

History 
The house was founded in Avize by Arthur Agrapart at the end of the 19th century.
His grandson, Pierre, expanded the production  in the 1950s-1960s.  Since 1984, the estate has been run by Pascal Agrapart and his brother, Fabrice.

Vineyards
The vineyards are spread over 12 hectares in the Côte des Blancs among 62 parcels,
most  in the grand cru villages of Avize, Cramant, Oiry and Oger.  The vines average about 35 years of age, with some over 60 years.

Viniculture
The house produces three vintage dated Champagnes: Minéral, L'Avizoise and Vénus. 
Agrapart practically never chaptalizes. The house produces less than 6,000 cases per year.

Awards and honors
Agrapart & Fils has received  the highest possible rating of three-stars  in La Revue du vin de France's Le guide des meilleurs vins de France. A 3-star rating  was awarded to only nine Champagne estates in total, including Selosse, Egly-Ouriet and Krug.

References 

Champagne (wine)